Pihlajavesi Old Church (Finnish: Pihlajaveden vanha kirkko), also known as Pihlajavesi Wilderness Church (Finnish: Pihlajaveden erämaakirkko), is a Lutheran church in the town of Pihlajavesi, in Central Finland. It is called 'Wilderness Church', because it is situated in a forest outside the main populated areas.

Background
Pihlajavesi formed part of the large Ruovesi parish, and travel to the nearest church was difficult due to lack of roads in the area; therefore the populace petitioned the Archdiocese of Turku cathedral chapter for a permission to build their own local chapel and cemetery. The request was granted, but during the design and construction phase what was originally intended as a small prayer room gradually grew into a full-blown church, which the permission did not allow. The Diocese complained and admonished the Kirkkoherra (Vicar) of Keuruu over this unlicensed development, initially refusing to sanction its use, but allowed the building to remain and eventually consecrated it as a church in 1787.

When a new, larger and more modern church was built in Pihlajavesi in 1870, the old church was abandoned and fell into such disrepair that it was scheduled for demolition. It was, however, rediscovered and renovated in the 1920s, followed by a replacement roof installed in 1966.

The church is not heated, and therefore mostly used during the summer months, when it is popular as a wedding church and a venue for small-scale concerts and events.

Architecture

It is of timber construction, with the massive logs unclad both on the exterior and interior sides. There is an integral bell tower  under a wood shingle roof, at the western end of the building, above the entrance. The church is a notable example of 18th-century Finnish church design, and of the 'long church' (pitkäkirkko) style typical to parts of the southern and western Finland. It is also revealing of timber construction methods of the time, especially thanks to the unlined wall and ceiling structures.

The church and its surrounding milieu have been designated and protected by the Finnish Heritage Agency as a nationally important built cultural environment (Valtakunnallisesti merkittävä rakennettu kulttuuriympäristö).

Somewhat unusually, the church has never had an altarpiece or housed any other church art.

Gallery

References

External links
: Keuruu Parish website (in Finnish)
: tour of the church

Churches completed in 1783
Lutheran churches in Finland
Buildings and structures in Central Finland
Keuruu
Wooden churches in Finland